Table Top Mountain is a mountain in the city and borough of Juneau, Alaska, United States.

The United States Geological Survey named the mountain in 1962, and it was entered into the Survey's Geographic Names Information System on March 31, 1981.

Climate

Based on the Köppen climate classification, Table Top Mountain has a subarctic climate with cold, snowy winters, and mild summers. Weather systems coming off the Gulf of Alaska are forced upwards by the Boundary Ranges (orographic lift), causing heavy precipitation in the form of rainfall and snowfall. Temperatures can drop below −20 °C with wind chill factors below −30 °C. The month of July offers the most favorable weather for viewing and climbing Table Top Mountain.

See also
Mount Roberts

References

Gallery

External links
 
 Weather forecast: Table Top Mountain

Boundary Ranges
Mountains of Juneau, Alaska
Mountains of Alaska